Bobby Evans Jr. (born March 24, 1997) is an American football offensive tackle who is a free agent. He played college football at Oklahoma.

Professional career

Los Angeles Rams
Evans was drafted by the Los Angeles Rams in the third round (97th overall) of the 2019 NFL Draft.

Evans was placed on the reserve/COVID-19 list by the team on December 18, 2020, and activated on December 29.

Evans won his first Super Bowl ring when the Rams defeated the Cincinnati Bengals 23-20 in Super Bowl LVI.

On December 31, 2022, Evans was released by the Rams.

Minnesota Vikings
On January 3, 2023, Evans signed with the practice squad of the Minnesota Vikings.

References

External links
 Los Angeles Rams bio
Oklahoma Sooners bio

Feed The Family

1997 births
Living people
American football offensive tackles
Los Angeles Rams players
Minnesota Vikings players
Oklahoma Sooners football players
People from Allen, Texas
Players of American football from Texas
Sportspeople from the Dallas–Fort Worth metroplex